Noble -Live- is a live album by Versailles, released on September 1, 2010. It is a live version of their debut album Noble (not including "To the Chaos Inside" and "Episode"), but also includes "Prince".

Track listing

References 

Versailles (band) live albums
2010 live albums